Fotbal Club Dinamo-Auto Tiraspol, commonly known as FC Dinamo-Auto Tiraspol, or simply Dinamo-Auto, is a Moldovan football club from Tiraspol, Moldova, playing in the village of Tîrnauca, Slobozia. They play in the Moldovan Super Liga, the highest tier of Moldovan football.

History

In the summer of 2022, the Pelican impresario agency took over the club from Tiraspol and announced that they will use the team as a launching pad for players who are under contract with the agency.

Before the start of 2022–23 season of the Moldovan Super Liga, the new management of Dinamo-Auto changed the whole squad, bringing 23 new players, 5 Moldovans and 18 foreigners.

League and cup

European

Notes
 QR: Qualifying round

Current squad

Achievements
Divizia B
Winners (1): 2009–10

References

External links
 
FC Dinamo-Auto on Soccerway.com

 
FC Dinamo-Auto
Football clubs in Transnistria
Association football clubs established in 2009
Football clubs in Moldova